This is a table of river distances of various locations (c. 1930) along the Murrumbidgee River upstream from Hay, New South Wales. Negative values indicate distances downstream.

Note that river distances are by their nature highly imprecise, will always be greater than straight line distances, and frequently greater than road distances.

See also
Distances along the Murrumbidgee, a list of distances between towns.
List of Murray River distances
List of Darling River distances

References 

New South Wales-related lists
Murray-Darling related lists